The Golden Reel Award for Outstanding Achievement in Sound Editing – Sound Effects and Foley for Non-Theatrical Documentary Broadcast Media is an annual award given by the Motion Picture Sound Editors. It honors sound editors whose work has warranted merit in the field of television; in this case, their work in the field of sound effects and foley work in non-theatrical documentary broadcast media.

The category was first presented as two different categories, Best Sound Editing - Long Form Documentary (2010-2016) and Best Sound Editing - Short Form Documentary (2011-2016), the two categories were renamed in 2014 to Best Sound Editing - Long Form Sound Effects, Foley, Dialogue and ADR in Television Documentary and Best Sound Editing - Short Form Sound Effects, Foley, Dialogue and ADR in Television Documentary, respectively. In 2017, the categories were merged into the current category.

Winners and nominees

2010s
 Best Sound Editing - Long Form Documentary

 Best Sound Editing - Short Form Documentary

 Best Sound Editing - Long Form Sound Effects, Foley, Dialogue and ADR in Television Documentary

 Best Sound Editing - Short Form Sound Effects, Foley, Dialogue and ADR in Television Documentary

 Outstanding Achievement in Sound Editing - Sound Effects, Foley, Music, Dialogue and ADR for Non-Theatrical Documentary Broadcast Media

2020s

References

Golden Reel Awards (Motion Picture Sound Editors)